Deception is an American crime procedural drama television series created for ABC by Chris Fedak. The series was produced by Berlanti Productions and VHPT Company in association with Warner Bros. Television, with Fedak serving as showrunner. The series premiered on March 11, 2018.

The series starred Jack Cutmore-Scott as Cameron Black, a superstar magician who joins the FBI as a consulting illusionist to help them solve crimes after his career is ruined by a scandal. Ilfenesh Hadera, Lenora Crichlow, Justin Chon, Laila Robins, Amaury Nolasco, and Vinnie Jones also star in the show. In September 2016, the series received a pilot production commitment at ABC, and received a pilot order in January 2017. The cast was filled out in early 2017, and filming on the pilot began in New York City in March 2017. The series was officially ordered by ABC in May 2017.

On May 11, 2018, ABC cancelled the show after one season.

Premise
After his career as a magician is ruined by a scandal, Las Vegas illusionist Cameron Black becomes the world's first "consulting illusionist" as he works with the FBI to solve odd crimes.

Cast and characters

Main
 Jack Cutmore-Scott as Cameron Black, a Las Vegas illusionist who works with the FBI to solve crimes. Cutmore-Scott also portrays Cameron's twin brother, Jonathan Black.
 Danny Corbo as young Cameron Black
 Sonny Corbo as young Jonathan Black
 Ilfenesh Hadera as Kay Daniels, a take-charge, hard-working FBI special agent who teams up with Black
 Lenora Crichlow as Dina Clark, Black's producer/makeup artist
 Justin Chon as Jordan Kwon, a street magician who works on Black's team
 Laila Robins as Deakins, an FBI special agent and Daniels and Alvarez's unit's commander
 Amaury Nolasco as Mike Alvarez, a classic FBI agent who is secretly a huge fan of magic, and of Cameron Black in particular
 Vinnie Jones as Gunter Gastafsen, hailed as the "world's greatest illusion builder"

Recurring
 Stephanie Corneliussen as "the mystery woman", a mysterious woman from Jonathan's past known as "The Sorceress with Magic Eyes"
 Alexandra Lenarchyk as young girl 
 Naren Weiss as Dekker, the "weapons visionary" for the mysterious woman
 Evan Parke as Winslow, an inmate who coerces Jonathan to do odd jobs for him
 Billy Zane as "Switch", an artist with ties to the mysterious woman
 Tanc Sade as Lance Bauer

Guest
 Brett Dalton as Isaac Walker, a CIA agent who has a romantic past with Kay
 Jack Davenport as Sebastian Black
 Mario Van Peebles as Bruce Conners

Episodes

Production

Deception was given a pilot production commitment by ABC on September 14, 2016, with the project being developed by Chris Fedak and magician David Kwong. The pilot was ordered on January 19, 2017, followed by a series order a few months later on May 12. On February 10, 2017, Jack Cutmore-Scott was cast in the lead role as Cameron Black, followed a few days later by the casting of Ilfenesh Hadera as Kay Daniels, Lenora Crichlow as Dina Clark, and Amaury Nolasco as Mike Alvarez. The following month, Justin Chon joined the cast as Jordan Kwon, while Vinnie Jones was cast as Gunter Gastafsen. In May 2017, it was revealed that Laila Robins had been cast as special agent Deakins.

Production on the pilot began in March 2017, with filming taking place in New York City. Filming for the rest of the season began in September 2017, and ended in February 2018. The series is composed by Blake Neely and Nathaniel Blume.

Release
Deception began airing on March 11, 2018, on ABC in the United States, and on CTV in Canada. The pilot was screened on July 19, 2017, at San Diego Comic-Con International. On October 8, 2017, members of the cast and the executive producers attended New York Comic Con to promote the series and screen the pilot.

Reception

Ratings

International success
In France, under the name "Cameron Black: l'illusionniste", it became a ratings hit, becoming the number one show in its timeslot.

In Germany, after airing only 7 episodes, Deception had already broken viewing records.

Critical response
The review aggregator website Rotten Tomatoes reported a 60% approval rating with an average rating of 6.01/10 based on 9 reviews. The website's consensus reads, "Deception isn't particularly original or thoughtful, but there's still some lighthearted fun to be found hidden up its sleeve." Audience reaction on the same website has a 93% approval rating. Metacritic, which uses a weighted average, assigned a score of 51 out of 100 based on 8 critics, indicating "mixed or average reviews". According to The New York Times, Deception scores 3 out of 5, and that it is one of the latest shows that are trying to be Castle.

Awards and online polls
In E!'s TVScoopAwards, Deception dominated categories, winning 3 awards including Worst Shocker, Breakout Actor (Jack Cutmore-Scott), and Best new 2017/18 Show.

References

External links
 
 

2018 American television series debuts
2018 American television series endings
2010s American crime drama television series
2010s American police procedural television series
2010s American mystery television series
American Broadcasting Company original programming
English-language television shows
Fictional stage magicians
Television series by Warner Bros. Television Studios
Television shows set in New York City